Bhukarka is a village in Nohar Tehsil in Hanumangarh district of Rajasthan, India. It belongs to Bikaner division.

Villages in Hanumangarh district